The 1933 Tour de Suisse was the inaugural edition of the Tour de Suisse cycle race and was held from 28 August to 2 September 1933. The race started and finished in Zürich. The race was won by Max Bulla.

General classification

References

1933
Tour de Suisse